Joshua Heschel Zoref (1633–1700) was a 17th-century ascetic, and an important figure in the Lithuanian Sabbatean movement.  During the messianic fervor of 1666, he claimed to experience visions similar to those of Ezekiel. He, like Judah Leib Prossnitz also, considered himself to be possessed of the role of Messiah ben Joseph, with Shabbatai Tzvi playing the role of Messiah ben David.

Shortly thereafter he began transcribing his visions into five books.  What has survived of these works show them to be entirely built upon the numerical speculations (gematriah) of Nathan Nata Spira.  Some parts of this work, named Sefer Ha-Zoref, came to Nathan ben Levi, while others came into the possession of the Baal Shem Tov, who evidently valued them highly while unaware of their origins.

Scholem (1974) contains a lengthier biography.

References 

Sabbateans
17th-century Lithuanian people
Lithuanian Jews
1633 births
1700 deaths
Authors of Kabbalistic works
Hebrew-language writers